Velika Brijesnica is a village in Bosnia and Herzegovina. It is part of the municipality of Doboj East, in the Federation of Bosnia and Herzegovina.

Before the Bosnian War it was part of the municipality of Doboj and had 1,771 resident in 1991. It is located on the Trebava mountain and it's bordered by the river Spreča and the mountain of Ozren.

Demographics 
According to the 2013 census, its population was 1,872.

References

Populated places in Doboj Istok